The Dagouein Mountain is an average elevation of  above sea level, is the seventh highest point in Djibouti. The mountain forms one of the geographic resources of the area.

History
The first known people that inhabited the mountain are the Issa Somali. The most famous town in the area is the town of Assamo located 9 km southeast. The principal languages spoken in the area are Somali.

Climate and Geography
The Dagouein Mountain lie south of the Ali Sabieh Region in Djibouti. The altitude and size of the range affects the climate in the mountains precipitation levels vary greatly and climatic conditions consist of distinct zones. Wildlife  live in the higher peaks to elevations of 1,124 m (3,688 ft). The mountain is located approximately 20 kilometres (12 mi) south east of Ali Sabieh, 9 kilometres (5 mi) from Assamo by road. It's near the Ethiopia border

References 

Mountains of Djibouti